Meshullam is a biblical masculine name meaning "Befriended". 

In the Hebrew Bible, the name Meshullam was borne by eleven characters:
 One of the chief Gadites in Bashan during the time of Jotham.  
 Grandfather of Shaphan, "the scribe", in the reign of Josiah. 
 A Levite of the family of Kohath, in the reign of Josiah. 
 A son of Elpaal.. 
 One of two sons of Zerubbabel, the other being Hananiah.
 A priest, head of the House of Ezra.. 
 A chief priest. 
 One of the leading Levites in the time of Ezra. 
 A priest. 
 One of the principal Israelites who supported Ezra when expounding the law to the people.

See also
List of minor biblical figures, L–Z

List of people with the name Meshullam
 Israel Meshullam Solomon (1723–1794), born as Israel Meshullam Zalman Emden in Altona near Hamburg, Chief Rabbi of the United Kingdom and rabbi of the Hambro Synagogue
 Meshullam Feivush Heller of Zbarazh (c.1742–1794), author of several Hasidic sefarim including the Yosher Divrei Emes
 Meshulam Fayish Tzvi (Herman) Gross or Grosz (1863–1947), businessman, inventor, learned layman, and author
 Meshullam HaKohen ben Ya'akov, also known as Rabbeinu Meshullam haGodol (Rabbi Meshullam the Great), Franco-Jewish Talmudist of the twelfth century CE
 Moshe Meshullam Halevy Horowitz (1832–1894), Galician rabbi
 Yerucham ben Meshullam (1290–1350), prominent rabbi and posek during the period of the Rishonim

References

Set index articles on Hebrew Bible people